The Asia/Oceania Zone was one of three zones of regional competition in the 2003 Fed Cup.

Group I
Venue: Tokyo, Japan (outdoor hard) 
Date: 21–25 April

The eleven teams were divided into two pools of five and six teams. The teams that finished first and second in the pools played-off to determine which team would partake in the World Group Play-offs. The two nations coming last in the pools were relegated to Group II for 2004.

Pools

Play-offs

  and  advanced to 2003 World Group Play-offs.
  and  relegated to Group II in 2004.

Group II
Venue: Tokyo, Japan (outdoor hard) 
Date: 21–24 April

The four teams played in one pool of four, with the two teams placing first and second in the pool advancing to Group I for 2004.

Pool

  and  advanced to Group I for 2004.

See also
Fed Cup structure

References

 Fed Cup Profile, Japan
 Fed Cup Profile, China
 Fed Cup Profile, South Korea
 Fed Cup Profile, New Zealand
 Fed Cup Profile, Indonesia
 Fed Cup Profile, Thailand
 Fed Cup Profile, Chinese Taipei
 Fed Cup Profile, Uzbekistan
 Fed Cup Profile, Malaysia
 Fed Cup Profile, India
 Fed Cup Profile, Philippines
 Fed Cup Profile, Pacific Oceania

External links
 Fed Cup website

 
Asia Oceania
Sports competitions in Tokyo
Tennis tournaments in Japan